Major-General Sir Hugh Keppel Bethell  (1882–1947) was a senior British Army officer.

Military career

Educated at Charterhouse School and the Royal Military Academy, Woolwich, Bethell was commissioned into the Royal Garrison Artillery on 24 December 1902.

Seeing active service during the First World War, he became commanding officer of the 1st Battalion, the Northamptonshire Regiment on the Western Front in late 1915, commander of the 74th Brigade in late 1916 and General Officer Commanding 66th (2nd East Lancashire) Division in March 1918. Aged just 36, he was the youngest British divisional commander of the 20th century.

After the war he became military attaché to Washington, D.C. in 1919, commander of 2nd Rhine Brigade in April 1924 and Brigadier on the general staff at Northern Command in India in April 1928. His last appointment was as General Officer Commanding Presidency and Assam District in India in December 1930 before retiring in December 1934. Following his retirement he was appointed a Knight Commander of the Order of the British Empire in the 1935 Birthday Honours.

References

1882 births
1947 deaths
British Army generals of World War I
Knights Commander of the Order of the British Empire
Companions of the Order of the Bath
Companions of the Order of St Michael and St George
Commanders of the Royal Victorian Order
Companions of the Distinguished Service Order
Royal Field Artillery officers
People educated at Charterhouse School
British military attachés
Northamptonshire Regiment officers
British Army major generals
Graduates of the Royal Military Academy, Woolwich
Military personnel from Norfolk
People from Quidenham